John Gardiner Richards Jr. (September 11, 1864October 9, 1941) was the 96th Governor of South Carolina from 1927 to 1931.

Biography
He was born in Liberty Hill, South Carolina on September 11, 1864 to John G. Richards and Sophia Edwards Smith.

He attended schools in Liberty Hill and North Carolina's Bingham Military Institute for a short time.

In 1898 he was elected to the South Carolina House of Representatives.
In 1910 he was appointed as the South Carolina Railroad Commissioner.

The South Carolina Constitution had been amended in 1926 to give the governor a four-year term and Richards became the first South Carolina governor elected for a four-year term. His time as Governor was noted for his strict observance of Blue laws, even chastising golfers for playing on Sunday.

He died on October 9, 1941 on Liberty Hill, South Carolina.

References

External links
SCIway Biography of Governor John Gardiner Richards
South Carolina Encyclopedia Biography of Governor John Gardiner Richards
Letter written in 1926 by John G. Richards

1864 births
1941 deaths
Democratic Party members of the South Carolina House of Representatives
Democratic Party governors of South Carolina
University of South Carolina trustees
People from Kershaw County, South Carolina